The Yoruba are most likely the most well-known West African ethnic group in the world due to their vast population in West Africa and broad dispersion through enslavement in the Americas.

The Republic of Benin and Nigeria contain the highest concentrations of Yoruba people and Yoruba faiths in all of Africa. Brazil, Cuba, Haiti, Jamaica, Trinidad, and Tobago are the Americas countries where Yoruba cultural influences are the most noticeable, particularly in popular religions like Vodon, Santéria, Camdomblé, and Macumba. (In 1989, it was believed that more than 70 million individuals in Africa and the New World participated in Yoruba religion in one way or another.) The most prevalent West African religions, both in Africa and the Americas, are likely those of the Yoruba people or those that were influenced by them. These West African faiths may also have the most intricate theologies. For instance, the Yoruba are thought to have a pantheon of up to 6,000 deities.

The following is a list of Yoruba orisha (òrìṣà), or deities.

Some in Oyo say Ọ̀ṣọ́ọ̀sì is female, Ogun's wife.

Supreme being
The Supreme God has three manifestations:
Olodumare - The Lord God of the Source of Creation
Olorun - The Lord God of Heaven
Olofi - The Lord God of the Palace, conduit between Orún (Heaven) and Ayé (Earth).

Metaphysical personifications or spirits
Orunmila - spirit of wisdom, divination, destiny, and foresight
Ori - personification of one's spiritual intuition and destiny

Àwọn òrìṣà ọkùnrin (male orishas)
Aganjú - orisha that was a warrior king, walked with a sword as a staff, and is associated with fire. He is not associated with volcanoes in Yorùbáland in West Africa, contrary to what is believed in Cuban-style practice of orisa.
Agemo - the chameleon servant of the supreme god Olorun.
Ọbalúayé - orisha of the Earth and strongly associated with infectious disease and healing
Erinlẹ̀ - an elephant hunter and physician to the gods
Èṣù - Èṣù is the orisha of crossroads, duality, beginnings and balance
Ibeji - twin orisha of vitality and youth
Lógunẹ̀dẹ - a warrior and hunter
Ọbàtálá - creator of human bodies; orisha of light, spiritual purity, and moral uprightness
Odùduwà - progenitor orisha of the Yorubas
Ògún - orisha who presides over iron, fire, hunting, agriculture and war
Okó - a hunter and farmer 
Osanyin - orisha of the forest, herbs and medicine 
Oṣùmàrè - divine rainbow serpent associated with creation and procreation
Ọ̀ṣọ́ọ̀sì - orisha of the hunt, forest, strategy and of the knowledge 
Ṣàngó - orisha of the thunders and lightnings
Akògún - a warrior and hunter, wear straw

Àwọn òrìṣà Obinrin (Female Orishas)

Ajé - orisha of wealth
Ayao - orisha of air
Yewa - orisha of the Yewa River. Also associated with cemeteries, dreams, virginity, clarity and magic as well as the patron deity over abused or abandoned children and the initiator of change. She is Oya’s younger sister and brings the souls of the dead to her.
Nàná Bùkùú - orisha of the river and of the earth
Ọbà - first wife of Ṣàngó and orisha of domesticity and marriage
Ọtìn - orisha of the river Otín, she is hunter and wife of Erinlẹ̀
Olókun - orisha of the seas 
Ọ̀ṣun - orisha who presides over love, intimacy, beauty, wealth, diplomacy and of the Ọ̀ṣun river
Ọya - orisha of the Niger River; associated with wind, lightning, fertility, fire, and magic. Oya is thought to be the offspring of the prehistoric god Obatala and his wife Yemoja. Oya is linked to acts of creation and fertility, perhaps in acknowledgment of the vital role that water plays in the survival of plants, animals, and people. In addition to taking the essential herbs indicated by the Babalawo, women who seek to become pregnant could also be instructed to offer food and beverages as sacrifices to Oya on a riverbank.
Yemọja - a mother goddess; patron deity of women and of the Ogun river
Yemowo - wife of Ọbàtálá and of the water. Said to be the original form of most female orishas i.e. Yemoja, Oshun, Yewa, etc.

Difference between Yoruba òrìṣà worship and what is practiced among Afro-Hispanics

These are the major orisha worshipped in Santería / Regla de Ocha / Lucumí religion:

Elegua, Yemayá (Yemọja), Oshún (Ọ̀ṣun),  Shangó (Sangó), Obatalá, Oya, and Ogún etc. (missing: Elegba and Oshosi),

or: 

Elegba, Yemayá (Yemọja), Osún, Shangó (Sangó), Obatalá, Oya, and Oshoshi. (missing: Elegua and Ogún) 

As one can see, Babalú-Ayé (whom "Ricky Ricardo" sings to in his famous song) is a very lesser deity in Afro-Hispanic worship.

Cuban African worship, sometimes referred to as Santería, is still widely practiced in Cuba, Puerto Rico, the Dominican Republic, Panama, Venezuela, Colombia, Tobago/Trinidad and Brazil, a number of practitioners are Yoruba descendants to certain degrees.  Remnants of the Yoruba language is still used ceremoniously as a ritual language, and is referred to as Lukumí. Due to 200 years of separation from the motherland, Lukumí became a lexicon of words and is not a spoken language. Similar worship of African deities can also be found among the Afro-Franco populations of Haiti and the US state of Louisiana.

References

Yoruba deities
Yoruba
Deities, Yoruba